is a 1999 film written and directed by Yuji Nakae about Nanako Agarikinjo (Naomi Nishida) returning to Aguni Island (Okinawa) to visit her grandmother, Nabbie Agarikinjo, played by Tomi Taira.

The film score is by Kenichiro Isoda, with two tracks by Michael Nyman, working separately. The film tied with Rituparno Ghosh's Bariwali for the Netpac Award at the Berlin International Film Festival. Director Nakae won Best Director at the Japanese Professional Movie Awards, which also presented a Special Award to producer Shirō Sasaki. Naomi Nishida won the Hochi Film Award for Best Supporting Actress for the role of Nanako. Isoda won Best Film Score at Mainichi Film Concours. Nishida also won Best Supporting Actress at the Yokohama Film Festival, and Jun Murakami (as Fukunosuke, as well as for roles in two other films) tied for Best Supporting actor with Teruyuki Kagawa.

Music

The film's music is an eclectic mix of Japanese, English, and Irish influences.

External links 
 

1999 films
1990s Japanese-language films
Films directed by Yuji Nakae
Films set in Okinawa Prefecture
Films set on islands
1990s Japanese films